Ion Țiriac (born 9 May 1939), also known as the "Brașov Bulldozer", is a Romanian businessman and former professional tennis and ice hockey player. He has been president of the Romanian Tennis Federation.

A former singles top 10 player on the ATP Tour, Tiriac was the winner of one grand slam title, the 1970 French Open in men's doubles. Țiriac was the first man to play against a woman and defeat her, in a sanctioned tennis tournament (against Abigail Maynard, in 1975). The highlight of his ice hockey career was participating as defenseman in the Romanian national team at the 1964 Winter Olympics.

After retirement, Tiriac became active as a tennis coach, advisor and player agent in the 1980s, taking under his wing Ilie Năstase, Manuel Orantes, Adriano Panatta, Guillermo Vilas, Henri Leconte and the young Boris Becker. Later, Țiriac developed the Mutua Madrid Open ATP masters tennis tournament, which he owns. In 2013, he was elected as contributor into the International Tennis Hall of Fame. He has been managing French tennis player Lucas Pouille since December 2016.

As a tennis player, Tiriac played dramatic five-setters against Rod Laver, Stan Smith, Jan Kodeš and Manuel Orantes. His singles record includes wins over Arthur Ashe, Stan Smith, Roscoe Tanner, Manuel Orantes, Andrés Gimeno, Adriano Panatta and Niki Pilić. He played three Davis Cup finals (in 1969, 1971 and 1972).

As of April 2022, Forbes ranked him as the third-richest person in Romania with a net worth of $1.6 billion.

Sports career
Țiriac was born in Transylvania, which is probably the reason why he has the nickname 'Count Dracula'. He first appeared on the international sports scene as a child ping pong champion, then subsequently as an ice hockey player on the Romanian national team at the 1964 Winter Olympics. Shortly after that he switched to tennis as his main sport. With fellow Romanian Ilie Năstase he won the men's doubles in the 1970 French Open and reached the Davis Cup finals several times in the 1970s.

John McPhee wrote of him that his drooping mustache suggests "that this man has been to places most people do not imagine exist.  He appears to be a panatela ad, a triple agent from Alexandria, a used-car salesman from central Marrakesh. Tiriac has the air of a man who is about to close a deal in a back room behind a back room."

Țiriac participated in the short period during the 1970s when women dabbled as coeds in established men's tennis tournaments. In his first match he defeated Abigail Maynard 6–0, 6–0 in their round one match at USTA pro circuit's Fairfiled County International Tennis Championship. It was the first time ever a female had entered a men's tournament.

After his retirement, he served as coach and manager for players such as Ilie Năstase, Guillermo Vilas, Mary Joe Fernández, Goran Ivanišević and Marat Safin. He became the sports agent of Boris Becker and managed his career from 1984 to 1993.

Țiriac was president of the Romanian Olympic and Sports Committee from 1998 to 2004.

Țiriac ran major men's events in Germany, including the season-ending championships in Hanover. Although tennis is now a much smaller part of his portfolio and occupies only 5 percent of his time, he has taken particular pleasure and pride in making Madrid Tennis Open a combined men's and women's event with €7.2 million in total prize money. The trophy awarded to the tournament winner bears his name.

Țiriac also holds the license for the BRD Năstase Țiriac Trophy tennis tournament since 1996. It is currently a €450,000 event, part of the ATP World Tour 250 series, held annually in Bucharest, Romania, just 2 weeks before the Madrid Open.

In 2012, Țiriac was nominated for the International Tennis Hall of Fame in the contributor category.

On 13 July 2013, Țiriac joined the International Tennis Hall of Fame as a successful promoter and tournament director for numerous events including the two of the largest Masters 1000 events, the Italian Open and the Madrid Masters.

Business career

After his retirement as a professional tennis player, Țiriac became a businessman in (then West) Germany. In 1987, he appeared in a TV commercial for Miller Lite beer with Bob Uecker, who extols Țiriac's supposed humorous qualities, laughing hysterically while Țiriac sits stone-faced. (In reality, Țiriac was popular and outgoing, especially when he served as player/coach of the Boston Lobsters of World Team Tennis in the 1970s.)

In Germany, Țiriac met another Romanian businessman, Dan Petrescu. Țiriac and Petrescu became economic partners and collaborated in the development of several companies in the following years.

Following the collapse of communism in Romania, Țiriac started numerous businesses and investments back home. In 1990, he founded Ion Țiriac Bank, the first private bank in post-Communist Romania. Between that and several other enterprises (retail, insurance, auto leasing, auto dealerships, airlines, etc.), his fortune was estimated at over US$900 million in 2005.

Țiriac is an avid car collector. The Tiriac Collection represents the exhibition of cars and motorcycles under his ownership. Reopened to the public in May 2015, the collection includes historical vehicles manufactured since 1899 and also modern exotics with about 350 cars and 165 cars at full time display on a rotation basis. Visitors will find the only collection in the world with 2 Rolls-Royce Phantoms IV, as well as exhibits that previously belonged to great names such as Sir Elton John, Sammy Davis Jr. or Bernie Ecclestone.

In 2006, Țiriac was selected as one of the 100 Greatest Romanians, ranking #77.

Ion Țiriac became the first Romanian to enter Forbes' List of billionaires in the 2007 Forbes rankings, ranking 840th in the world. His wealth was estimated at $1.0 billion as of 2010, according to the magazine. In 2010, TOP 300 Capital declared Ion Țiriac the richest man in Romania with a wealth estimated at €1.5–€1.6 billion ($2–$2.2 billion).

In 2018, Ion Țiriac ranked #1867 on the Forbes World's Billionaires list, with wealth listed at US$1.2 billion.

Personal life 
Țiriac was married to Erika Braedt, a handball player, between 1963 and 1965.

He has a son, Ion Țiriac Jr., with Mikette von Issenberg, a fashion model; and further two children, Karim Mihai and Ioana Natalia, with Sophie Ayad, an Egyptian journalist.

According to Cinemagia, he dubbed the character Kron for the Romanian version of Dinosaur.

Career statistics

Grand Slam finals

Doubles 2 (1–1)

Grand Prix and WCT Tour finals (24–25)

Singles (2–1)

Doubles (22–24)
Key

Performance timeline

Companies
Țiriac Holdings
ȚiriacAIR
Allianz-Țiriac Asigurări România
ȚiriacAuto
Țiriac Leasing
Tir Travel (formerly Țiriac Travel)

See also
 Capital Top 300 wealthiest men in Romania

References

Selected publications

External links

Forbes World's Billionaires #840
Ion Tiriac; Tennis's Grandest Bad Boy June 24, 1993 The New York Times

1939 births
Living people
Grand Slam (tennis) champions in men's doubles
Ice hockey players at the 1964 Winter Olympics
International Tennis Hall of Fame inductees
Olympic ice hockey players of Romania
Sportspeople from Brașov
Romanian billionaires
Romanian businesspeople
Romanian male tennis players
Universiade medalists in tennis
People named in the Panama Papers
Universiade gold medalists for Romania
Universiade bronze medalists for Romania
French Open champions
Medalists at the 1961 Summer Universiade
Medalists at the 1965 Summer Universiade
Presidents of the Romanian Olympic and Sports Committee
Presidents of the Romanian Tennis Federation